There have been two baronetcies created for persons with the surname Mann, one in the Baronetage of Great Britain and one in the Baronetage of the United Kingdom.

The Mann Baronetcy, of Linton Hall in the County of Kent, was created in the Baronetage of Great Britain on 3 March 1755 for Horace Mann. The second Baronet represented Maidstone and Sandwich in the House of Commons. The title became extinct on his death in 1814. The second Baronet's sister, Catherine Mann, married the Right Reverend James Cornwallis, 4th Earl Cornwallis. Their son James Cornwallis assumed by Royal licence the surname of Mann in lieu of Cornwallis in 1814. In 1824 he succeeded in the earldom of Cornwallis (see Earl Cornwallis).

The Mann Baronetcy, of Thelveton Hall in Thelveton in the County of Norfolk, was created in the Baronetage of the United Kingdom on 29 December 1905 for Edward Mann. He was Chairman of Mann, Crossmann & Paulin, Ltd, brewers, and of Brandon's Putney Brewery Ltd.

Mann baronets, of Linton Hall (1755)

Sir Horace Mann, 1st Baronet (–1786)
Sir Horace Mann, 2nd Baronet (1744–1814)

Mann baronets, of Thelveton Hall (1905)

Sir Edward Mann, 1st Baronet (1854–1943)
Sir (Edward) John Mann, 2nd Baronet (1883–1971)
Sir Rupert Edward Mann, 3rd Baronet (born 1946)

References
Kidd, Charles, Williamson, David (editors). Debrett's Peerage and Baronetage (1990 edition). New York: St Martin's Press, 1990.

Baronetcies in the Baronetage of the United Kingdom
Extinct baronetcies in the Baronetage of Great Britain
Baronetcies created with special remainders